The discography of British singer-songwriter and YouTuber Dorothy Miranda "Dodie" Clark consists of one studio album, six extended plays, 15 singles, and 40 music videos. She has also uploaded multiple original songs and covers to her YouTube channels doddleoddle and doddlevloggle.

Studio albums

Extended plays

Singles

As lead artist

As featured artist

Guest appearances

YouTube songs
All original songs and covers uploaded on Dodie's YouTube channels.

Original songs

Covers

Music videos

References

Clark, Dodie